A craft or trade is a pastime or an occupation that requires particular skills and knowledge of skilled work. In a historical sense, particularly the Middle Ages and earlier, the term is usually applied to people occupied in small scale production of goods, or their maintenance, for example by tinkers. The traditional term craftsman is nowadays often replaced by artisan and by craftsperson (craftspeople).

Historically, the more specialized crafts with high-value products tended to concentrate in urban centers and formed guilds. The skill required by their professions and the need to be permanently involved in the exchange of goods often demanded a generally higher level of education, and craftsmen were usually in a more privileged position than the peasantry in societal hierarchy. The households of craftsmen were not as self-sufficient as those of people engaged in agricultural work, and therefore had to rely on the exchange of goods.  Some crafts, especially in areas such as pottery, woodworking, and various stages of textile production, could be practiced on a part-time basis by those also working in agriculture, and often formed part of village life.

When an apprentice finished his apprenticeship, he became a journeyman searching for a place to set up his own shop and make a living. After he set up his own shop, he could then call himself a master of his craft.

This stepwise approach to mastery of a craft, which includes the attainment of some education and skill, has survived in some countries until today. But crafts have undergone deep structural changes since and during the era of the Industrial Revolution. The mass production of goods by large-scale industry has limited crafts to market segments in which industry's modes of functioning or its mass-produced goods do not satisfy the preferences of potential buyers. As an outcome of these changes, craftspeople today increasingly make use of semi-finished components or materials and adapt these to their customers' requirements or demands. Thus, they participate in a certain division of labour between industry and craft.

Nature of craft skill 
The nature of craft skill and the process of its development are continually debated by philosophers, anthropologists, and cognitive scientists. Some scholars note that craft skill is marked by particular ways of experiencing tools and materials, whether by allowing tools to recede from focal awareness, perceiving tools and materials it terms of their practical interrelationships, or seeing aspects of work that are invisible to the untrained observer. Other scholars working on craft skill focus on observational learning and mimicry, exploring how learners visually parse the movements of experts. Certain researchers even de-emphasize the role of the individual craftsperson, noting the collective nature of craft understanding or emphasizing the role of materials as collaborators in the process of production.

Classification 

There are three aspects to human creativity - art, crafts, and science. Roughly determined, art relies upon intuitive sensing, vision and expression, crafts upon sophisticated technique and science upon knowledge.

Handicraft 

Handicraft is the "traditional" main sector of the crafts, it is a type of work where useful and decorative devices are made completely by hand or by using only simple tools. The term is usually applied to traditional means of making goods. The individual artisanship of the items is a paramount criterion, such items often have cultural and/or religious significance. Items made by mass production or machines are not handicraft goods. Handicraft goods are made with craft production processes.

The beginning of crafts in areas like the Ottoman Empire involved the governing bodies requiring members of the city who were skilled at creating goods to open shops in the center of town. These people slowly stopped acting as subsistence farmers (who created goods in their own homes to trade with neighbors) and began to represent what we think of a "craftsman" today.

Besides traditional goods, handicraft contributes to the field of computing by combining craft practices with technology. In 1968, the Apollo 8 spacecraft's core memory consisted of wires that women of color wove around and through electromagnetic cores by hand. The core rope memory they created contained information used to successfully complete the mission.

In recent years, crafts and craftspeople have slowly been gaining momentum as a subject of academic study. For example, Stephanie Bunn was an artist before she became an anthropologist, and she went on to develop an academic interest in the process of craft - arguing that what happens to an object before it becomes a 'product' is an area worthy of study.

The Arts and Crafts Movement 

The term crafts is often used to describe the family of artistic practices within the family of decorative arts that traditionally are defined by their relationship to functional or utilitarian products (such as sculptural forms in the vessel tradition) or by their use of such natural media as wood, clay, ceramics, glass, textiles, and metal.

The Arts and Crafts Movement originated in Britain during the late 19th century and was characterized by a style of decoration reminiscent of medieval times. The primary artist associated with the movement is William Morris, whose work was reinforced with writings from John Ruskin. The movement placed a high importance on the quality of craftsmanship, while emphasizing the importance for the arts to contribute to economic reform.

Studio crafts 

Crafts practiced by independent artists working alone or in small groups are often referred to as studio craft. Studio craft includes studio pottery, metalwork, weaving, woodturning, paper and other forms of woodworking, glassblowing, and glass art.

Craft fairs  

A craft fair is an organized event to display and sell crafts. There are craft stores where such goods are sold and craft communities, such as Craftster, where expertise is shared.

Tradesperson 

A tradesperson is a skilled manual worker in a particular trade or  craft. Economically and socially, a tradesperson's status is considered between a laborer and a professional, with a high degree of both practical and theoretical knowledge of their trade. In cultures where professional careers are highly prized, there can be a shortage of skilled manual workers, leading to lucrative niche markets in the trades.

See also

Communities

References

External links

 
Skills
Medieval economics